The 1916 New Hampshire gubernatorial election was held on November 7, 1916. Republican nominee Henry W. Keyes defeated Democratic nominee John C. Hutchins with 53.20% of the vote.

General election

Candidates
Major party candidates
Henry W. Keyes, Republican
John C. Hutchins, Democratic

Other candidates
William H. Wilkins, Socialist
Ralph E. Meras, Prohibition

Results

References

1916
New Hampshire
Gubernatorial